Heteroscypha is a genus of fungi in the order  Auriculariales. Species form cup-shaped, cyphelloid basidiocarps (fruit bodies) with basidia that are wholly or partly septate. They are presumed to be saprotrophic, growing on dead wood. Originally described in the Tremellales, the genus was placed in its own family, the Heteroscyphaceae, by Jülich and included within the Auriculariales by Wells. Further research is required to determine its true disposition.

References

Auriculariales
Basidiomycota genera
Taxa described in 1979